James Michael Riley (born May 9, 1977) is an American novelist, most famous for the fantasy series Story Thieves. His other works include the Half Upon a Time trilogy and the Revenge of Magic series. All thirteen of his novels have been published by Aladdin, an imprint owned by Simon & Schuster.

Early life 

James Riley was born in Connecticut on May 9, 1977. He majored in English at Georgetown University in Washington, D.C. Before becoming a writer, he considered a career as an attorney, worked as a travel editor, and worked at Disney. In 2014, he moved from Los Angeles, California, to Virginia.

Writing career

Half Upon a Time series 

James Riley's first published novel, Half Upon a Time, was released on September 7, 2010. It is a fantasy novel centered around a boy named Jack, the fictional son of the main character from the children's story Jack and the Beanstalk, and a girl named May who is from our nonfictional world. The novel incorporates plot points from various Brothers Grimm fairy tales, including Little Red Riding Hood, Sleeping Beauty, and Snow White. This is Riley's first story centered around the idea that the fictional and nonfictional worlds are connected, a common theme in his first eight novels.

The two other books in the trilogy, Twice Upon a Time (published April 24, 2012) and Once Upon the End (published May 7, 2013), expand upon May and Jack's adventures as they seek to thwart the main antagonist, known as the Wicked Queen.

Half Upon a Time was included on the 2014–2015 Sunshine State Young Readers Award Middle School Master List, was a Mark Twain Award Final Nominee, and was listed as a NCTE/CLA Notable Children's Book in the English Language Arts. Once Upon the End was included on the MSTA Reading Circle List.

Story Thieves series 

James Riley launched his second series with the release of the novel Story Thieves on January 20, 2015. The novel centers around Owen, a nonfictional boy from our world, and Bethany, a half-fictional girl. The duo works to stop a fictional wizard named the Magister from the Kiel Gnomenfoot series (a parody of Dumbledore from the Harry Potter series), as he angrily reacts to the realization that he is a fictional character.

James Riley covers a number of different genres in the Story Thieves series. Story Thieves: The Stolen Chapters (published January 19, 2016) is a mystery novel. Story Thieves: Secret Origins (published January 17, 2017) is a superhero novel with occasional comic book-style pages. Story Thieves: Pick the Plot (published September 26, 2017) is James Riley's first gamebook, but unlike most gamebooks, it is not set in second person. Pick the Plot makes a substantial attempt to break the fourth wall, not only in its gamebook genre but also due to its plot twist in which Owen discovers that the fictional and nonfictional worlds originated from the same universe before the Big Bang. The final book in the series, Story Thieves: Worlds Apart (published March 20, 2018) returns to the original Story Thieves'''s fantasy genre, and sees Owen and Bethany work to foil the ambitions of the main antagonist, Nobody.Story Thieves appeared on The New York Times Best Seller list for twenty-three consecutive weeks, as well as on the Publishers Weekly bestsellers list.

 The Revenge of Magic series The Revenge of Magic, the first book in Riley's third series, was released on March 5, 2019, almost a year after his previous work. Shortly after an attack on Washington, D.C., by magical giants and his father's resulting death, Fort Fitzgerald is recruited to a government-run school for magic. Here, Fort encounters an "Old One", an otherworldly being which vaguely resembles characters of the same name from the Cthulhu Mythos. Fort and other children from the school eventually use magic to banish the Old One before it can summon others of its race to their reality.

Later books in the series include The Revenge of Magic: The Last Dragon, published on October 8, 2019, The Revenge of Magic: The Future King, published on March 3, 2020, The Revenge of Magic: The Timeless One, published on October 3, 2020, and The Revenge of Magic: The Chosen One, published on March 2, 2021. As with the Story Thieves series, the cover art for the Revenge of Magic series is by Vivienne To.

The film rights for The Revenge of Magic'' were acquired by Greg Silverman's Stampede Ventures, an independent film company, in August 2018.

References

External links 

 
 James Riley on Tumblr
 
 
 

1977 births
Living people
American fantasy writers
21st-century American male writers
21st-century American novelists
Writers from Connecticut
Writers from Alexandria, Virginia
Georgetown University alumni